This page lists the World Best Year Performance in the year 1993 in the men's decathlon. One of the main events during this season were the 1993 World Championships in Stuttgart, Germany, where the competition started on Thursday August 19, 1993, and ended on Friday August 20, 1993.

Records

1993 World Year Ranking

See also
 1993 Hypo-Meeting
 1993 Décastar

References
decathlon2000
apulanta
digilander

1993
Decathlon Year Ranking, 1993